Orrin Erastus Freeman (1830–1866) was an American professional photographer in China and Japan. Freeman worked in the ambrotype process.
 
For a short time, Freeman opened a photography studio in Shanghai in 1859 before leaving China for Japan.
 
Freeman established a studio in Yokohama in 1860.  He is considered to have been the first Western professional photographer to establish a permanent residence in Japan.

He taught the elements of photography to Ukai Gyokusen who established the first photographer studio in Edo (Eishin-dō) in 1861. Gyokusen's camera, equipment and supplies were purchased from Freeman.

His death in 1866 was sudden. He is buried in Yokohama Foreigner's Cemetery (Gaijin Bochi).

Notes

References
 Bennett, Terry. (2006). Photography in Japan, 1853-1912. Boston: Tuttle. ; 
 Hannavy, John. (2007). Encyclopedia of Nineteenth-century Photography. London: Routledge. ; 

1830 births
1866 deaths
Photography in China
American expatriates in China
Photography in Japan
American expatriates in Japan
Pioneers of photography